Ayala Bridge, in Filipino "Tulay ng Ayala" and in Spanish "Puente de Ayala", is a steel truss bridge over the Pasig River in Manila, Philippines. It connects the districts of Ermita and San Miguel, passing over the western tip of Isla de Convalecencia. It carries Circumferential Road 1 (C-1) and National Route 180 (N180), linking Ayala Boulevard in Ermita to P. Casal Street in San Miguel.

History

Ayala Bridge was originally two separate timber-built bridges (divided into the "San Miguel" and "Concepcion" sections after each side's point of origin, converging into Isla de la Convalecencia) when it was first built in 1872 by Don Jacobo Zóbel y Zangroniz of Casa Róxas (the present-day Ayala Corporation).

Scarcely 10 years after it was opened to traffic, the bridge's condition had degenerated considerably that in 1899, the "San Miguel" portion collapsed, with "Concepcion" following suit months later. Steel became the main material in 1908, and Ayala Bridge became the first steel bridge in the Philippines. Its current form is attributed to a 1930s reconstruction, when it was decided to unify the bridge in a singular route.

Ayala Bridge was closed to the public in early 2015 to undergo rehabilitation and structural repairs to ensure structural integrity. The bridge fully reopened to the motorists in November 2015.

See also
 List of crossings of the Pasig River

Notes

References 

Bridges in Manila
Buildings and structures in Ermita
Buildings and structures in San Miguel, Manila
Spanish colonial infrastructure in the Philippines
Bridges completed in 2015
Bridges completed in 1908
Bridges completed in 1872
1872 establishments in the Philippines